Mathias of Inis Ní was a Medieval Irish saint.

Biography

Inis Ní (Inishnee Island) is located in Bertraghboy Bay in Connemara, Ireland, and contains the remains of a chapel and well dedicated to Mathias, the probable founder of the Christian settlement on the island. The chapel is surrounded by a rectangular graveyard, with an altar to the north-east containing an upright cross-inscribed slab.

See also

 Macdara
 Scaithin
 Malachy Ó Caollaidhe
 Seven Sisters of Renvyle

References

 A Guide to Connemara's Early Christian Sites, Anthony Previté, Oughterard, 2008. 

People from County Galway
Medieval Gaels from Ireland